The 1924 Cuba hurricane is the earliest officially classified Category 5 Atlantic hurricane on the Saffir–Simpson scale (SSHS), as well as the first Atlantic hurricane with sustained wind speeds of at least 135, 140, and 145 knots (155, 160, and 165 miles per hour). It is also one of two hurricanes to make landfall on Cuba at Category 5 intensity, the other being Hurricane Irma in 2017 – both are also tied for the strongest Cuban landfall in terms of maximum sustained winds. The hurricane formed on October 14 in the western Caribbean, slowly organizing as it tracked northwestward. By October 16, the storm attained hurricane status to the east of the Yucatán Peninsula, and subsequently executed a small counterclockwise loop. Shortly thereafter, it struck extreme western Cuba at peak intensity, becoming the strongest hurricane on record to hit the country. While crossing the state it weakened to tropical storm status, and after accelerating east-northeastward, it was absorbed by a cold front on October 23, to the south of Bermuda.

Across the western Caribbean Sea, the developing storm produced heavy rainfall and increased winds. Strong winds in western Cuba caused severe damage, with two small towns nearly destroyed. About 90 people were killed in the country, all in Pinar del Río Province. Later, the hurricane brought heavy rainfall to southern Florida, which caused flooding and crop damage. Damage was light in the state, and there were no casualties.

Meteorological history

On October 14, a tropical depression was first observed over the western Caribbean Sea, just off the eastern Honduras coast. It was a large and weak tropical cyclone, moving slowly northwestward and gradually intensifying. On October 15, it is estimated the depression attained tropical storm status, and its strengthening became more steady. Around that time, it began to execute a small counterclockwise loop off the east coast of the Yucatán Peninsula. The estimation of its strength at this point was based on subsequent analysis of peripheral recordings of atmospheric pressure and maximum sustained winds by ships and land stations.

This wind report was initially thought to be the peak intensity of the cyclone; however, subsequent research confirmed further deepening, based on very low pressures recorded across the region. A ship in the radius of maximum winds reported a reading of 922 mbar; the barometer on the ship was found to be 5 mbar too high, resulting in a pressure of 917 mbar. Late on October 19, the hurricane made landfall in extreme western Cuba in Pinar del Río Province. José Carlos Millás, director of the National Observatory at Havana, believed that "this hurricane [was] one of the most severe ever experienced in our latitudes."

After exiting Cuba into the Gulf of Mexico, the hurricane weakened greatly. The cyclone weakened further as it turned eastward through the state, deteriorating to tropical storm status as it passed near or over Miami. It then accelerated east-northeastward, moving over the Abaco Islands in The Bahamas. Gradually weakening, the storm began interacting with an approaching cold front; late on October 23, it transitioned into an extratropical cyclone, and was absorbed by the front shortly thereafter.

Impact and records
As a developing tropical cyclone, the storm produced increased winds and lower pressures in the Swan Islands, off the coast of Honduras. Heavy rainfall occurred throughout Jamaica, causing street flooding and several mudslides, but little damage. No disruptions were reported to communications or railway travel. The storm brushed eastern Belize while located off the coast, producing  of rainfall and light winds.

In extreme western Cuba, damage was very severe from the strong winds, likened to the impact of a tornado. Severe damage was reported in Los Arroyos and Arroyos de Mantua. In the latter location, around a dozen people were killed, 50 were injured, and nearly every building in the town was severely damaged; heavy losses also occurred to the tobacco crop. Across western Pinar del Río Province, the hurricane destroyed all communication links. Around the country, the hurricane capsized several ships, primarily fishing vessels. The death toll in the country was estimated at 90. In the days after the storm, Cuban President Zayas authorized about $30,000 in relief aid to send to hurricane victims in Pinar del Río.

Several days prior to striking Florida, the outer circulation began producing rainfall across the state. Storm warnings were issued along the east and west coastlines northward to Cedar Key and Titusville. Later, hurricane warnings were issued for much of the same area, and schools in the Tampa area were closed as the storm was expected to move ashore. Little damage occurred in the region, limited to downed trees; this was due to advance warning by the U.S. Weather Bureau, which advised ships to remain at port and for residents to secure property. Later, the hurricane moved ashore in a sparsely populated region of southwestern Florida. Damage was reported in Fort Myers and Punta Gorda and communications were temporarily cut, although no deaths were reported. Heavy rainfall was reported along its path, and one location accumulated  in a 24‑hour period; this established a new one-day rainfall record in the state. A station in Miami recorded , and wind gusts in the area approached hurricane force. The combination of winds and rain damaged 5% of the local citrus and avocado crop. The rainfall flooded streets, homes, and commercial buildings in the Miami area, and hundreds of people were left without telephone access. No impact was reported in the Bahamas.

The hurricane is the earliest known to have attained the intensity, besting the 1928 Okeechobee hurricane, which was previously thought to be the earliest storm of this intensity. A hurricane in 1846 that hit the country was also thought to have struck at Category 5 status, although the storm existed prior to the start of the Atlantic hurricane database.

When the steamship "Toledo" recorded an atmospheric pressure of  during the 1924 Cuba hurricane, it was the lowest pressure recorded in an Atlantic hurricane, breaking the previous record of 924 mbar (27.28 inHg) in the Atlantic hurricane of 1853.

See also

 List of Category 5 Atlantic hurricanes
 List of Florida hurricanes (1900–1949)
 1932 Cuba hurricane
 Hurricane Irma

References

C (1924)
1924
1924
1924
C (1924)
C (1924)
1924 natural disasters in the United States
1924 meteorology